The Australian College of Theology (ACT) is an Australian higher education provider based in Sydney, New South Wales. The college delivers awards in ministry and theology and was one of the first Australian non-university providers to offer an accredited bachelor's degree and a research doctorate.  It is now one of two major consortia of theological colleges in Australia, alongside the University of Divinity.
Over 22,000 people have graduated since the foundation of the college.  On 7 October 2022 it was granted university college status by the Tertiary Education Quality and Standards Agency. 

The primate of the Anglican Church of Australia presides as chairman at a general meeting of the Australian College of Theology Limited. The current chair of the board is Roger Lewis. The current dean is James Dalziel, while the deputy dean is Edwina Murphy.

History

The college was established by the 1891 General Synod of the Church of England in Australia and Tasmania. The college was founded in order to provide for the "systematic study of divinity", especially among clergy and ordination candidates, there being no realistic opportunities for them to earn a Bachelor of Divinity (BD) degree at English universities and Australian universities refusing to offer theological education.

In 1899, there were four awards of the college - the Associate in Theology, the Licentiate in Theology, the Scholar in Theology and the Fellow of the College of Theology - and about 30 students. Today the college offers a wide range of accredited higher education awards catering not only for the specialised needs of ministerial and missionary candidates but also for the needs of lay people interested in an understanding of the Christian faith and its implications for contemporary life.

The ACT is a national consortium of affiliated colleges with 17 theological and Bible colleges approved to deliver its accredited courses. Over 1,500 equivalent full-time students, or over 3,000 individual active students and research candidates, are enrolled in courses each year.

On 12 November 2004, the delegate of the Minister for Education, Science and Training approved the college as a higher education provider (HEP) under the Higher Education Support Act 2003 (Cth). This approval took effect in March 2005. As a HEP, the ACT administers the FEE-HELP program, by which students enrolled in accredited higher education courses of the ACT may receive an income contingent loan for their tuition fees.

As of September 2007, the college is a company limited by guarantee.

In addition, as a HEP under the Higher Education Support Act, the ACT was required to undergo a quality audit conducted by the Australian Universities Quality Agency (AUQA). In November 2006, the college was the first non-self-accrediting HEP to be audited. The AUQA audit report was completed in January 2007 and publicly released on the AUQA website in February 2007. The process was repeated in 2011 and the college underwent a Cycle 2 quality audit by AUQA. The report of the audit was publicly released on the website of the Tertiary Education Quality and Standards Agency in March 2012.

In July 2010, the college received self-accrediting authority through to 2015, under the terms of the National Protocols for Higher Education Approval Processes. The college is the first institution to be awarded self-accrediting status under the protocols. This means that the college can accredit its own courses in theology and ministry within the scope of the self-accrediting authority specified by the Department of Education and Training in New South Wales.
The college is currently accredited by TEQSA through till 2025.

On 7 October 2022 it was granted university college status by the Tertiary Education Quality and Standards Agency.

Affiliated colleges
New South Wales

 Chinese Theological College Australia
Christ College
Mary Andrews College
Morling College
Sydney Missionary and Bible College
Youthworks College

New Zealand
Laidlaw College, Auckland

Queensland
Brisbane School of Theology
Malyon College
Queensland Theological College
Trinity College Queensland

South Australia
Bible College of South Australia

Victoria
Melbourne School of Theology
Presbyterian Theological College
Reformed Theological College
Ridley College

Western Australia
Trinity Theological College
 the Perth campus of Morling College

Courses
The accredited higher education courses have grown from the Bachelor of Theology (BTh) degree, first accredited in 1975 and the research degree of Master of Theology (MTh) in 1976. The Master of Arts (Theology) (MA[Th]) degree was added in 1988.  1992 saw the accreditation of the Bachelor of Ministry (BMin) degree – the first of several coursework degrees in theology with a ministry major. The Doctor of Ministry (DMin), a doctorate modelled on Australian university professional doctorates and North American Doctor of Ministry degrees, was first accredited in 1998.

The courses of the college are accredited by the Australian College of Theology, under approval as a self-accrediting provider.

Undergraduate Certificate of Theology
Undergraduate Certificate of Ministry
Diploma of Theology
Diploma of Ministry
Diploma of Theology / Diploma of Ministry
Advanced Diploma of Theology
Advanced Diploma of Ministry
Associate Degree of Ministry
Associate Degree of Theology
Bachelor of Christian Studies
Bachelor of Theology
Bachelor of Ministry
Bachelor of Theology / Bachelor of Ministry
Bachelor of Theology (Honours)
Bachelor of Ministry (Honours)
Graduate Certificate of Divinity
Graduate Diploma of Divinity
Master of Ministry
Master of Divinity
Master of Divinity / Graduate Diploma of Divinity
Graduate Certificate of Christian Studies
Graduate Certificate of Pastoral Care for Mental Health
Graduate Certificate of Christian Mentoring
Graduate Certificate of Christian Leadership
Graduate Certificate of Leadership
Master of Christian Leadership
Master of Arts (Christian Studies)
Master of Missional Leadership
Master of Arts (Theology)
Master of Arts (Ministry)
Master of Theology
Doctor of Ministry
Doctor of Philosophy
Doctor of Theology

List of Registrars & Deans
There have been nine heads of the ACT, who were firstly known as Registrar and now known as Dean.

 Rev Canon William Hey Sharp, Registrar, 1896-1927
 Ven Dr Archdeacon John Forster, Registrar, 1928-1945
 Rev Dr Canon Frank Cash, Registrar, 1946-1960
 Rev Canon Colin H. Duncan, Registrar, 1961-1973
 Rev Dr Canon Stuart Babbage (Stuart Barton Babbage), Registrar, 1973-1991
 Rev Dr John Pryor, Dean, 1991-1995
 Rev Dr Mark Harding, Dean, 1996-2016
 Rev Dr Martin Sutherland, Dean, 2016-2020
 Professor James Dalziel, Dean, 2020-current

Notable alumni
Peter Adam, former principal of Ridley College (Melbourne)
John Armstrong, Anglican bishop
Robert J. Banks, biblical scholar and practical theologian
Paul Barker, bishop in the Anglican Church of Australia
Paul Barnett, Anglican bishop, ancient historian and New Testament scholar
Geoffrey Bingham, former principal of the Bible College of South Australia
Brad Billings, Anglican bishop
Peter Carnley, former Anglican Primate of Australia
Ross Clifford, Baptist theologian, political commentator, radio personality and author
Gordon Cheng, author
Richard Condie, the Anglican Bishop of Tasmania
Mark Durie, scholar in linguistics and theology
John Dickson, apologist, historian and founder of the Centre for Public Christianity
John Fleming, priest and bioethicist
Michael Frost, Baptist missiologist
Kevin Giles, author and Anglican priest
Graeme Goldsworthy, evangelical Anglican theologian
Harry Goodhew, Anglican Archbishop of Sydney from 1993 to 2001
John Harrower, eleventh Anglican Bishop of Tasmania
Alan Hirsch, missional thinker and author
Philip Edgecumbe Hughes, New Testament scholar, professor at Westminster Theological Seminary
Grenville Kent, academic, film producer, author and Christian communicator
Norman Lacy, politician and Victorian Government minister 1979 to 1982
Peter Jensen, retired Anglican Archbishop of Sydney, theologian and academic
Phillip Jensen, former dean of St Andrew's Cathedral in Sydney
Marcus Loane, former Anglican Archbishop of Sydney, and former Anglican Primate of Australia
Leon Morris, New Testament scholar
Dianne "Di" Nicolios, Anglican archdeacon
Michael Raiter, former principal of the Melbourne School of Theology
Keith Rayner, former Anglican Primate of Australia
Charles Sherlock, theologian
Geoffrey Smith, current Anglican Primate of Australia
Ray Smith, Anglican bishop
Dominic Steele, Anglican priest and podcaster
Daniel Willis, former CEO of the Bible Society in New South Wales
Bruce W. Winter, New Testament scholar

Notable faculty and staff

 Peter Adam, former principal of Ridley College
 Michael Bird, academic dean at Ridley College
 Ross Clifford, principal of Morling College
 Mark Durie, lecturer at Melbourne School of Theology
 John Dickson, fellow and lecturer at Ridley College
 Michael Frost, lecturer at Morling College
 Peter Jensen, retired Australian Anglican bishop, theologian and academic, Moore College (when part of the ACT)
 Leon Morris, former principal of Ridley College

References

External links 
 

 
1891 establishments in Australia
Anglican Church of Australia
Educational institutions established in 1891
Seminaries and theological colleges in New South Wales